The 1986 Prince Edward Island general election was held on April 21, 1986.

The election resulted in the defeat of the two-term Progressive Conservative government by the Liberals led by Joe Ghiz. Ghiz, the son of a Lebanese store owner, went on to become the first Canadian premier that was not of complete European descent.

Party standings

Members elected

The Legislature of Prince Edward Island had two levels of membership from 1893 to 1996 - Assemblymen and Councillors. This was a holdover from when the Island had a bicameral legislature, the General Assembly and the Legislative Council.

In 1893, the Legislative Council was abolished and had its membership merged with the Assembly, though the two titles remained separate and were elected by different electoral franchises. Assembleymen were elected by all eligible voters of within a district. Before 1963, Councillors were only elected by landowners within a district, but afterward they were elected in the same manner as Assemblymen.

Kings

Prince

Queens

Sources

1986 elections in Canada
Elections in Prince Edward Island
1986 in Prince Edward Island
April 1986 events in Canada